The Apertura 2017 Copa MX Final was the final of the Apertura 2017 Copa MX, the eleventh edition of the Copa MX under its current format and 78th overall organized by the Mexican Football Federation, the governing body of association football in Mexico.

The final was contested in a single leg format between Liga MX clubs Monterrey and Pachuca. The match was hosted by Monterrey at Estadio BBVA Bancomer in the Monterrey suburb of Guadalupe on 21 December 2017. The winners will earn a spot to face the winners of the Clausura 2018 in the 2018 Supercopa MX.

Qualified teams

Venue

Due to the tournament's regulations, the higher seed among both finalists during the group stage will host the final, thus Estadio BBVA Bancomer will host the final. The venue which opened on 2 August 2015 is the newest venue in Liga MX and has been home to Monterrey since the Apertura 2015 season. The venue has previously hosted two Liga MX finals, the Clausura 2016 and the Apertura 2017.

Background
Monterrey has won the tournament once while Pachuca has won it twice in the Amateur era (1907–1943) but never in the Professional era. Pachuca won the inaugural tournament in 1908 defeating Reforma 4–0 in the final. Before reaching this final, the last time Monterrey reached a reached a final of any kind was eleven days earlier where they lost to their arch-rivals UANL in the Apertura 2017 final. Pachuca last reached a final of any kind eight months earlier when they also defeated UANL 2–1 on aggregate to capture the 2016–17 CONCACAF Champions League. 

These two clubs last faced each other in a final the previous year when Pachuca won 2–1 on aggregate after a late equalizer in the 93rd minute in the Clausura 2016 Liga MX Final.

Monterrey won three, drew one and scored eight goals during group stage, as they were seeded third. They eliminated UdeG on penalty kicks in the Round of 16, Santos Laguna in the quarterfinals and América on penalty kicks in the semifinals.

Pachuca won three, drew one and scored four goals, as they were seeded fifth. They eliminated Zacatepec in the Round of 16, Tijuana in the quarterfinals and Atlante in the semifinals.

Road to the finals
Note: In all results below, the score of the finalist is given first.

Match

Notes

References

Copa MX Finals
2017–18 in Mexican football
2017 in Mexican sports